The Stepmother may refer to:

Theatre 
The Stepmother (1663 play), a tragicomedy by Robert Stapylton
The Stepmother, a 1920 one-act play by A. A. Milne
The Stepmother (1924 play),  a play by Githa Sowerby

Film 
The Step-Mother, a 1910 silent film by Sidney Olcott
The Stepmother, a 1914 short film by Harry Solter
The Stepmother (1958 film), an Azerbaijanian film
The Stepmother (1963 film), a 1963 Korean film starring Kim Jin-kyu
The Stepmother (1972 film), a film by Howard Avedis

See also
Stepmother
Stepmom (disambiguation)
Stepfather (disambiguation)